"State of Grace" is a song written and recorded by American singer-songwriter Taylor Swift. It was released for digital download as a promotional single from her fourth studio album Red on October 16, 2012, by Big Machine Records. Produced by Swift and Nathan Chapman, "State of Grace" is an arena rock song that uses chiming, feedback-drenched guitars and pounding drums. An acoustic version features as a deluxe-edition bonus track. The lyrics are about the tumultuous feelings evoked by the first signs of love.

Critics deemed the song's arena-rock production a showcase of Swift's expanding artistry beyond her previous country pop sound. They praised the production and emotional sentiments, and retrospectively regarded it as one of Swift's best songs. "State of Grace" peaked within the top 50 of singles charts in Australia, Ireland, New Zealand, and the UK. It reached number nine on the Canadian Hot 100 and number 13 on the Billboard Hot 100, and received a gold certification from the Recording Industry Association of America (RIAA).

Following a controversy regarding the ownership of Swift's masters, she re-recorded the song as "State of Grace (Taylor's Version)", as part of Red's re-recording, Red (Taylor's Version) (2021). "State of Grace (Taylor's Version)" peaked within the top 10 of singles charts in Ireland, Canada, and Singapore; and top 25 in Australia, New Zealand, the UK, and the US.

Background
In October 2010, singer-songwriter Taylor Swift released her third studio album Speak Now, which she wrote entirely by herself. She co-produced it with Nathan Chapman, who had produced both of her previous albums. Speak Now continued the country pop sound of Swift's previous records, with a radio-friendly pop crossover production and elements from various rock subgenres of the 1970s and 1980s decades. On Speak Now follow-up Red, Swift wanted to experiment beyond country pop and worked with different producers. Chapman remained a key collaborator on Red—he and Swift produced eight tracks, including "State of Grace". It was one of the first songs she wrote in Nashville, Tennessee, before she went to Los Angeles to enlist other producers.

Production and release 

Engineers Brian David Willis, Chad Carlson, and Matt Rausch recorded "State of Grace", and Justin Niebank mixed it, at Blackbird Studios, Nashville. Hank Williams mastered the track at Nashville's MasterMix studio. From September 24, 2012, to promote Red, Big Machine Records released on the iTunes Store one track each week until the album's October 22 release date as part of a four-week release countdown. "State of Grace" was released as the fourth promotional single from Red on October 16. An acoustic version, also produced by Swift and Chapman, was released as a deluxe-edition bonus track. Swift performed "State of Grace" live for the first time on November 15, 2012, during the second season of the U.S. version of The X Factor. She included it in her set list for the Z100 Jingle Ball at Madison Square Garden, New York City, on December 7, 2012. It was the opening number on the set list to Swift's Red Tour (2013–14). At the July 10, 2018, concert in Landover, Maryland, as part of her Reputation Stadium Tour, she sang "State of Grace" as a "surprise song".

After signing a new contract with Republic Records, Swift began re-recording her first six studio albums in November 2020. The decision came after a 2019 public dispute between Swift and talent manager Scooter Braun, who acquired Big Machine Records, including the masters of Swift's albums the label had released. By re-recording them, Swift had full ownership of the new masters, including the copyright licensing of her songs, devaluing the Big Machine-owned masters. The re-recordings of "State of Grace" and the acoustic version, both subtitled "(Taylor's Version)", were released as part of Red's re-recording, Red (Taylor's Version), on November 12, 2021. Both "State of Grace (Taylor's Version)" and "State of Grace (Acoustic Version) (Taylor's Version)" were produced by Swift and Christopher Rowe, and recorded by David Payne at Blackbird Studios, Nashville. Rowe recorded Swift's vocals at Kitty Committee Studio in Belfast, Northern Ireland, and Serban Ghenea mixed both tracks at MixStar Studios, Virginia Beach, Virginia.

Music and lyrics

"State of Grace" runs for four minutes and 55 seconds. It is an arena rock song that expands on the rock stylings of Speak Now with a production that critics described as "epic" and "massive". The track uses chiming, feedback-drenched guitars and pounding drums. In the re-recorded version, the drums are more defined. Swift sings loudly and with elongated syllables. Critics said the rock-leaning production departed from the country-pop sound of her previous albums, and cited Irish rock band U2 as a possible influence. According to musicologist James E. Perone, the track has a 1980s-college-rock throwback feel, a guitar sound evoking the style of U2 musician The Edge, and a melodic quality reminiscent of Australian rock band Men at Work (specifically citing their song "Who Can It Be Now?" as a reference point). Some journalists compared the song's style to that of U2's album The Joshua Tree (1987).

The lyrics are about the many possibilities of how a romance could proceed, and the tumultuous feelings evoked by the first signs of love. As Red's opening track, "State of Grace" sets the tone for an album about broken relationships and the conflicting emotions that ensue. It starts with pounding drums and vague lyrics about heartbreak; "We fall in love 'til it hurts or bleeds / or fades in time". In the second verse, the beats halt and Swift sings; "We are alone, just you and me / Up in your room and our slates are clean / Just twin fire signs / four blue eyes". After the second verse, fast-paced drums and loud guitars propel in the background. The narrator admits that the lover is not a "saint" and she has "loved in shades of wrong", and in the refrain admits, "And I never saw you coming/ And I'll never be the same". The track concludes with a realization, "Love is a ruthless game unless you play it good and right". The acoustic version relies on soft guitar and gentle drum notes to highlight Swift's vocals, which The A.V. Clubs Saloni Gajjar described as "velvety".

Some critics highlighted the maturity of Swift's songwriting. In Spin, Marc Hogan found the lyrics uplifting because Swift does not seek revenge for a failed relationship in the lines; "And I never saw you coming / And I'll never be the same". In a review for The Atlantic, Brad Nelson said Swift introduced more nuances to the narrative than those in her previous love songs; after "clichéd" lyrics at the beginning, she "gets writerly" with the second verse using "the kind of details that detach from a narrative and stretch over it like clouds", reminding Nelson of the work of Steely Dan songwriters Walter Becker and Donald Fagen.

Critical reception
Upon its release, "State of Grace" received positive reviews from critics, who complimented it as self-assured and effective. Many critics immediately deemed the arena-rock sound impactful and said it showcased a new aspect to Swift's artistry. In album reviews of Red, some critics picked "State of Grace" as a highlight for what they described as a compelling production and a confident delivery. Although some, such as Bernard Perusse from the Edmonton Journal and Randall Roberts from the Los Angeles Times, found "State of Grace" a worthwhile experimentation, Ben Rayner of the Toronto Star criticized it for "shamelessly knocking off U2 for a shot at rock-radio play". Jonathan Keefe from Slant Magazine and Sean Daly of Tampa Bay Times felt the production led to a diminishing quality of Swift's songwriting, but the latter remarked that it was "bold regardless".

Retrospective reviews of "State of Grace" have been generally positive, and several critics picked it as an example of Swift's artistic versatility and a high point on Red. Jordan Sargent of Spin described its production as a "thematically perfect musical [composition], unhurried as if to marinate on the moment but also fleetingly epic". On critics' rankings of Swift's entire catalog, the track was ranked in the top 10 by Hannah Mylrea of NME, Jane Song of Paste, and Nate Jones of Vulture, all lauding the arena-rock sound that Swift has since not recreated. Reviewing Red (Taylor's Version), Keefe appreciated how the reworked instrumentation gave the track a stronger emotional resonance. Jason Lipshutz from Billboard admired what he viewed as a concise hook and an exhilarating production, and proclaimed "State of Grace" as one of Swift's most enduring non-singles. The track featured on Billboard's 2017 list of the "100 Best Deep Cuts by 21st Century Pop Stars", and its editor Andrew Unterberger praised the refrain for "[saying] everything it needs to say in so few syllables".

Commercial performance
Upon its initial 2012 release, "State of Grace" charted in various Anglophone countries, peaking within the top 50 in Australia (44), Ireland (43), the UK (36), and New Zealand (20). The song peaked at number nine on the Canadian Hot 100 and at number 13 on the US Billboard Hot 100. In June 2017, it received a gold certification from the Recording Industry Association of America (RIAA), denoting 500,000 track-equivalent units based on sales and on-demand streaming. After Red (Taylor's Version) was released in November 2021, "State of Grace (Taylor's Version)" debuted on several single charts worldwide, peaking within the top 25 of Ireland (7), Canada (9), Singapore (10), New Zealand (12), the UK (18), the US (18), and Australia (25), and further reaching South Africa (77) and Portugal (89). It charted at number 12 on the Billboard Global 200.

Credits and personnel 
"State of Grace" (2012)

 Taylor Swift – vocals, songwriter, producer
 Nathan Chapman – producer, guitar
 Justin Niebank – mixer
 Brian David Willis – engineer
 Chad Carlson – engineer
 Matt Rausch – engineer
 Hank Williams – mastering engineer
 Drew Bollman – assistant mixer
 Leland Elliott – assistant recording engineer
 Nick Buda – drums
 Eric Darken – percussion

"State of Grace (Taylor's Version)" (2021)

 Taylor Swift – lead vocals, background vocals, songwriter, producer
 Christopher Rowe – producer, vocals engineer
 David Payne – recording engineer
 Dan Burns – additional engineer
 Austin Brown – assistant engineer, assistant editor
 Bryce Bordone – engineer
 Derek Garten – engineer, editor
 Serban Ghenea – mixer
 Amos Heller – bass guitar
 Matt Billingslea – drums, percussion, vibraphone
 Max Bernstein – electric guitar
 Mike Meadows – electric guitar, synthesizers
 Paul Sidoti – electric guitar
 Jonathan Yudkin – strings

Charts

"State of Grace"

"State of Grace (Taylor's Version)"

Certification

Notes

References

Citations 

 
 

2012 songs
American rock songs
Taylor Swift songs
Big Machine Records singles
Songs written by Taylor Swift
Song recordings produced by Taylor Swift
Song recordings produced by Nathan Chapman (record producer)
Song recordings produced by Chris Rowe